ORF or Orf may refer to:

 Norfolk International Airport, IATA airport code ORF
 Observer Research Foundation, an Indian research institute
 One Race Films, a film production company founded by Vin Diesel
 Open reading frame, a portion of the genome that has the potential to code for a protein
 Open Road Films, a joint venture of Regal Entertainment Group and AMC Theatres
 Operation River Falcon, a military operation in the Iraq War
 Operation Royal Flush, a military deception employed by the Allied Nations during the Second World War
 ORF (broadcaster), Austrian public service broadcaster
 Orf (disease), a cutaneous condition
 ORF format, Olympus raw image file format with extension .orf
 Orf, Iran, a village in Kohgiluyeh and Boyer-Ahmad Province, Iran

See also
 Orff (disambiguation)
 Orfe
 ORFS